Leslie Scalapino (July 25, 1944 – May 28, 2010) was an American poet, experimental prose writer, playwright, essayist, and editor, sometimes grouped in with the Language poets, though she felt closely tied to the Beat poets.  A longtime resident of California's Bay Area, she earned an M.A. in English from the University of California at Berkeley. One of Scalapino's most critically well-received works is way (North Point Press, 1988), a long poem which won the Poetry Center Award, the Lawrence Lipton Prize, and the American Book Award.

Life and work
Scalapino was born in Santa Barbara, California and raised in Berkeley. She traveled throughout her youth and adulthood to Asia, Africa and Europe and her writing was intensely influenced by these experiences. In childhood Scalapino traveled with her father Robert A. Scalapino (founder of UC Berkeley's Institute of East Asian Studies), her mother, and her two sisters (Diane and Lynne). She attended Reed College in Portland, Oregon and received her B.A. in Literature in 1966 before moving on to earn her M.A. at UC Berkeley. Scalapino published her first book O and Other Poems in 1976. During her lifetime, she published more than thirty books of poetry, prose, inter-genre fiction, plays, essays, and collaborations. Other well-known works of hers include The Return of Painting, The Pearl, and Orion : A Trilogy (North Point, 1991; Talisman, 1997), Dahlia's Iris: Secret Autobiography and Fiction (FC2), Sight (a collaboration with Lyn Hejinian; Edge Books), and Zither & Autobiography (Wesleyan University Press).

Scalapino's poetry has been widely anthologized, including appearances in the influential Postmodern American Poetry, From the Other Side of the Century, and Poems for the Millennium anthologies, as well as the popular Best American Poetry and Pushcart Prize series anthologies. Her work was the subject of a special "critical feature" appearing in an issue of the online poetry journal How2.

From 1986 until 2010, Scalapino ran the Oakland small press she founded, O Books.

Scalapino taught writing at various institutions, including 16 years in the MFA program at Bard College. Other schools she taught at over the years included Mills College, the San Francisco Art Institute, California College of the Arts, San Francisco State University, UC San Diego, and Naropa University.

References

Selected bibliography

Poetry
O and Other Poems, Sand Dollar Press, 1976
The Woman who Could Read the Minds of Dogs, Sand Dollar Press, 1976
Instead of an Animal, Cloud Marauder Press, 1978
This eating and walking is associated all right, Tombouctou, 1979
Considering how exaggerated music is, North Point Press, 1982
that they were at the beach — aeolotropic series, North Point Press, 1985
way, North Point Press, 1988
Crowd and not evening or light, O Books, 1992
Sight (with Lyn Hejinian), Edge Books, 1999
New Time, Wesleyan University Press, 1999
The Tango, (with Marina Adams), Granary Press, 2001
Day Ocean State of Stars' Night: Poems & Writings 1989 & 1999-2006, Green Integer (E-L-E-PHANT Series), 2007
It's go in horizontal, Selected Poems 1974-2006, UC Press, Berkeley, 2008

Fiction
The Return of Painting, DIA Foundation, 1990
The Return of Painting, The Pearl, and Orion : A Trilogy, North Point, 1991; Talisman, 1997
Defoe, Sun & Moon Press, 1995
The Front Matter, Dead Souls, Wesleyan University Press, 1996
Orchid Jetsam, Tuumba, 2001
Dahlia's Iris — Secret Autobiography and Fiction, FC2, November 2003

Inter-genre writings
The Public World / Syntactically Impermanence, Wesleyan University Press, 1999
How Phenomena Appear To Unfold , Potes & Poets Press, 1991Objects in the Terrifying Tense / Longing from Taking Place, Roof Books, 1994Green and Black, Selected Writings , Talisman Publishers, 1996R-hu, Atelos Press, 2000Zither and Autobiography, Wesleyan, 2003Floats Horse-Floats or Horse-Flows, Starcherone Books, 2010The Dihedrons Gazelle-Dihedrals Zoom, The Post-Apollo Press / O Books, 2010

PlaysGoya's L.A., a play, Potes & Poets Press, 1994 (music by Larry Ochs)Stone Marmalade (the Dreamed Title), (with Kevin Killian) Singing Horse Press, 1996The Weatherman Turns Himself In, Zasterle Press, Spain 1999Flow-Winged Crocodile & A Pair/Actions Are Erased/Appear'', Chax Press, Tucson AZ 2010

External links
Leslie Scalapino.com: Official Website
Leslie Scalapino Papers, MSS 668. Special Collections & Archives, UC San Diego Library.
obituary from family at the Electronic Poetry Center
How2 Special Feature: Leslie Scalapino
O Books, Scalapino-founded small press
Scalapino's Author Page at the Electronic Poetry Center
'The Tango' reviewed by Melissa Flores-Bórquez at poetry mag "Intercapillary Space"
Disbelief: History/Memory/Body: Language is the Trace of Being written for the Segue Panel "Language Poetry and the Body", May 12, 2007
 It’s go in horizontal by Leslie Scalapino A review by John Herbert Cunningham
The Dihedrons Gazelle-Dihedrals Zoom: Introductory note and chapters 6–12 Writes Scalapino in the "Introductory note": 

1944 births
2010 deaths
Language poets
English-language poets
American book publishers (people)
American editors
Reed College alumni
University of California, Berkeley alumni
Bard College faculty
Mills College faculty
San Francisco Art Institute faculty
California College of the Arts faculty
San Francisco State University faculty
University of California, San Diego faculty
Naropa University faculty
Writers from Santa Barbara, California
Writers from Berkeley, California
20th-century poets
20th-century American women writers
Modernist women writers
Modernist writers
American Book Award winners
American women academics
21st-century American women